Sakamoto Station may refer to:

 Sakamoto Station (Kumamoto) (坂本駅) in Kumamoto Prefecture, Japan
 Sakamoto Station (Miyagi) (坂元駅) in Miyagi Prefecture, Japan

It may also refer to:
 Sakamoto-hieizanguchi Station in Shiga Prefecture, Japan
 Cable Sakamoto Station in Shiga Prefecture, Japan
 Hieizan Sakamoto Station in Shiga Prefecture, Japan